The Gallipoli Heights are a group of peaks and ridges centered  south-southeast of Monte Cassino, in the Freyberg Mountains of Victoria Land, Antarctica. They were named in association with Lord Freyberg and the nearby Freyberg Mountains by the Northern Party of the New Zealand Geological Survey Antarctic Expedition, 1963–64. These topographical elevations lie situated on the Pennell Coast, a portion of Antarctica lying between Cape Williams and Cape Adare.

Features
Geographical features of Gallipoli Heights include:

Russet Hills

References

Mountains of Victoria Land
Pennell Coast